General elections were held in the Netherlands on 1 July 1925. The General League of Roman Catholic Caucuses remained the largest party in the House of Representatives, winning 30 of the 100 seats.

Results

References

General elections in the Netherlands
Netherlands
1925 in the Netherlands
July 1925 events
1925 elections in the Netherlands